The 2022 Zandvoort Formula 3 round was a motor racing event held on 3 and 4 September 2022 at the Circuit Zandvoort, Zandvoort, Netherlands. It was the eight and penultimate race of the 2022 FIA Formula 3 Championship, and was held in support of the 2022 Dutch Grand Prix.

Driver changes 
Due to their commitments at the 2022 Euroformula Open Championship in Imola this weekend, Oliver Goethe and Christian Mansell missed the Zandvoort round and were replaced by Sebastián Montoya and David Schumacher, driving for Campos Racing and Charouz Racing System respectively.

Classification

Qualifying
Zane Maloney took pole position ahead of Victor Martins and Jak Crawford. By securing his second pole in this season, the Bajan driver is the first driver in this season to become a repeat polesitter.

Notes:
 – Kush Maini received a five-place grid penalty for the Sprint Race due to causing a collision on the opening lap of the Feature Race in the previous round in Belgium.

Sprint race

Feature race 

Notes:
 – Zak O'Sullivan and Juan Manuel Correa originally finished twelfth and eighteenth, but were later given a ten-second time penalty for causing a collision with Oliver Bearman and Rafael Villagómez respectively.
 – Oliver Bearman originally finished tenth, but has been later awarded a drive-through penalty for failing to maintain the proper gap behind the Safety Car. As the penalty could not be served in the race, it has been converted to a 20-second time penalty.

Standings after the event 

Drivers' Championship standings

Teams' Championship standings

 Note: Only the top five positions are included for both sets of standings.

See also 
 2022 Dutch Grand Prix
 2022 Zandvoort Formula 2 round

Notes

References

External links 
 

Zandvoort
Formula 3
Zandvoort FIA Formula 3 round